Stellantis North America, officially FCA US and formerly Chrysler, is one of the "Big Three" automobile manufacturers in the United States, headquartered in Auburn Hills, Michigan. It is the American subsidiary of the multinational automotive company Stellantis. In addition to the Chrysler brand, Stellantis North America sells vehicles worldwide under the Dodge, Jeep, and Ram nameplates. It also includes Mopar, its automotive parts and accessories division, and SRT, its performance automobile division.

The original Chrysler Corporation was founded in 1925 by Walter Chrysler from the remains of the Maxwell Motor Company. It was acquired by Daimler-Benz, which in 1998 renamed itself DaimlerChrysler. After Daimler divested Chrysler in 2007, the company operated as Chrysler LLC (2007–2009) and Chrysler Group LLC (2009–2014) before being acquired by Fiat S.p.A. and becoming a subsidiary of the newly formed Fiat Chrysler Automobiles ("FCA") in 2014. Chrysler in 2021 is a subsidiary of Stellantis, the company formed from the merger between FCA and PSA Group (Peugeot Société Anonyme) in 2021.

After founding the company, Walter Chrysler used the General Motors brand diversification and hierarchy strategy that he had become familiar with when he worked in the Buick division at General Motors. He then acquired Fargo Trucks and the Dodge Brothers Company, and created the Plymouth and DeSoto brands in 1928. Facing postwar declines in market share, productivity, and profitability, as GM and Ford were growing, Chrysler borrowed $250 million in 1954 from Prudential Insurance to pay for expansion and updated car designs.

Chrysler expanded into Europe by taking control of French, British, and Spanish auto companies in the 1960s; Chrysler Europe was sold in 1978 to PSA Peugeot Citroën for $1 billion. The company struggled to adapt to changing markets, increased U.S. import competition, and safety and environmental regulation in the 1970s. It began an engineering partnership with Mitsubishi Motors, and began selling Mitsubishi vehicles branded as Dodge and Plymouth in North America. On the verge of bankruptcy in the late 1970s, it was saved by $1.5 billion in loan guarantees from the U.S. government. New CEO Lee Iacocca was credited with returning the company to profitability in the 1980s. In 1985, Diamond-Star Motors was created, further expanding the Chrysler-Mitsubishi relationship. In 1987, Chrysler acquired American Motors Corporation (AMC), which brought the profitable Jeep brand under the Chrysler umbrella. In 1998, Chrysler merged with German automaker Daimler-Benz to form DaimlerChrysler AG; the merger proved contentious with investors. As a result, Chrysler was sold to Cerberus Capital Management and renamed Chrysler LLC in 2007.

Like the other Big Three automobile manufacturers, Chrysler was impacted by the automotive industry crisis of 2008–2010. The company remained in business through a combination of negotiations with creditors, filing for Chapter 11 bankruptcy reorganization on April 30, 2009, and participating in a bailout from the U.S. government through the Troubled Asset Relief Program. On June 10, 2009, Chrysler emerged from the bankruptcy proceedings with the United Auto Workers pension fund, Fiat S.p.A., and the U.S. and Canadian governments as principal owners. The bankruptcy resulted in Chrysler defaulting on over $4 billion in debts. In May 2011, Chrysler finished repaying its obligations to the U.S. government five years early, although the cost to the American taxpayer was $1.3 billion. 

Over the next few years, Fiat S.p.A. gradually acquired the other parties shares. In January 2014, Fiat acquired the rest of Chrysler from the United Auto Workers retiree health trust, making Chrysler Group a subsidiary of Fiat S.p.A. In May 2014, Fiat Chrysler Automobiles was established by merging Fiat S.p.A. into the company.  Chrysler Group LLC remained a subsidiary until December 15, 2014, when it was renamed FCA US LLC, to reflect the Fiat-Chrysler merger.

History

1925–1998: Chrysler Corporation
The Chrysler company was founded by Walter Chrysler on June 6, 1925, when the Maxwell Motor Company (est. 1904) was re-organized into the Chrysler Corporation. The company was headquartered in the Detroit enclave of Highland Park, where it remained until completing the move to its present Auburn Hills location in 1996.

Chrysler had arrived at the ailing Maxwell-Chalmers company in the early 1920s, hired to overhaul the company's troubled operations (after a similar rescue job at the Willys-Overland car company). In late 1923 production of the Chalmers automobile was ended.

In January 1924, Walter Chrysler launched the well-received Chrysler automobile. The Chrysler Six was designed to provide customers with an advanced, well-engineered car, at an affordable price. Elements of this car are traceable to a prototype which had been under development at Willys during Chrysler's tenure The original 1924 Chrysler included a carburetor air filter, high compression engine, full pressure lubrication, and an oil filter, features absent from most autos at the time. Among the innovations in its early years were the first practical mass-produced four-wheel hydraulic brakes, a system nearly completely engineered by Chrysler with patents assigned to Lockheed, and rubber engine mounts, called "Floating Power" to reduce vibration. Chrysler also developed a wheel with a ridged rim, designed to keep a deflated tire from flying off the wheel. This wheel was eventually adopted by the auto industry worldwide.

The Maxwell brand was dropped after the 1925 model year, with the new, lower-priced four-cylinder Chryslers introduced for the 1926 year being badge-engineered Maxwells. The advanced engineering and testing that went into Chrysler Corporation cars helped to push the company to the second-place position in U.S. sales by 1936, which it held until 1949.

In 1928, the Chrysler Corporation began dividing its vehicle offerings by price class and function. The Plymouth brand was introduced at the low-priced end of the market (created essentially by once again reworking and rebadging the Chrysler Series 50 four-cylinder model). At the same time, the DeSoto brand was introduced in the medium-price field. Also in 1928, Chrysler bought the Dodge Brothers automobile and truck company and continued the successful Dodge line of automobiles and Fargo range of trucks. By the mid-1930s, the DeSoto and Dodge divisions would trade places in the corporate hierarchy.

The Imperial name had been used since 1926 but was never a separate make, just the top-of-the-line Chrysler. However, in 1955, the company decided to offer it as its own make/brand and division to better compete with its rivals, Lincoln and Cadillac. This addition changed the company's traditional four-make lineup to five (in order of price from bottom to top): Plymouth, Dodge, DeSoto, Chrysler, and the now-separate Imperial.

In 1954, Chrysler was the exclusive provider of its Hemi engine in the Facel Vega, a Paris coachbuilder that offered their own line of hand-built luxury performance cars, with the PowerFlite and TorqueFlite transmissions offered. The Facel Vega Excellence was a four-door hardtop with rear-hinged coach doors that listed for US$12,800 ($ in  dollars ).

On April 28, 1955, Chrysler and Philco announced the development and production of the World's First All-Transistor car radio. The all-transistor car radio, Mopar model 914HR, developed and produced by Chrysler and Philco, was a $150 option on the 1956 Imperial automobile models. Philco began manufacturing this radio in the fall of 1955 at its Sandusky Ohio plant.

On September 28, 1957, Chrysler announced the first production electronic fuel injection (EFI), as an option on some of its new 1958 car models (Chrysler 300D, Dodge D500, DeSoto Adventurer, Plymouth Fury). The first attempt to use this system was by American Motors on the 1957 Rambler Rebel. Bendix Corporation's Electrojector used a transistor computer brain modulator box, but teething problems on pre-production cars meant very few cars were made. The EFI system in the Rambler ran fine in warm weather, but suffered hard starting in cooler temperatures and AMC decided not to use this EFI system, on its 1957 Rambler Rebel production cars that were sold to the public. Chrysler also used the Bendix "Electrojector" fuel injection system and only around 35 vehicles were built with this option, on its 1958 production-built car models. Owners of EFI Chryslers were so dissatisfied that all but one were retrofitted with carburetors (while that one has been completely restored, with original EFI electronic problems resolved).

The Valiant was also introduced for the 1960 model year as a distinct brand. In the U.S. market, Valiant was made a model in the Plymouth line for 1961 and the DeSoto make was discontinued in 1961. With those exceptions per applicable year and market, Chrysler's range from lowest to highest price from the 1940s through the 1970s was Valiant, Plymouth, Dodge, DeSoto, Chrysler, and Imperial.

From 1963 through 1969, Chrysler increased its existing stakes to take full control of the French Simca, British Rootes, and Spanish Barreiros companies, merging them into Chrysler Europe in 1967. In the 1970s, an engineering partnership was established with Mitsubishi Motors, and Chrysler began selling Mitsubishi vehicles branded as Dodge and Plymouth in North America.

Chrysler struggled to adapt to the changing environment of the 1970s. When consumer tastes shifted to smaller cars in the early 1970s, particularly after the 1973 oil crisis, Chrysler could not meet the demand, although their compact models on the "A" body platform, the Dodge Dart and Plymouth Valiant, had proven economy and reliability and sold very well. Additional burdens came from increased US import competition, and tougher government regulation of car safety, fuel economy, and emissions. As the smallest of the Big 3 US automakers, Chrysler lacked the financial resources to meet all of these challenges. In 1976, with the demise of the reliable Dart/Valiant, quality control declined. Their replacements, the Dodge Aspen and Plymouth Volare, were comfortable and had good roadability, but owners soon experienced major reliability problems which crept into other models as well. Engines failed and/or did not run well, and premature rust plagued bodies. In 1978, Lee Iacocca was brought in to turn the company around, and in 1979 Iacocca sought US government help. Congress later passed the Loan Guarantee Act providing $1.5 billion in loan guarantees. The Loan Guarantee Act required that Chrysler also obtain $2 billion in concessions or aid from sources outside the federal government, which included interest rate reductions for $650 million of the savings, asset sales of $300 million, local and state tax concessions of $250 million, and wage reductions of about $590 million along with a $50 million stock offering. $180 million was to come from concessions from dealers and suppliers.  Also in 1978, Iacocca offloaded the ailing European operation to PSA Peugeot Citroën for a nominal $1, taking with it the group's substantial losses and debts which had been dragging the rest of the business down.

After a period of plant closures and salary cuts agreed to by both management and the auto unions, the loans were repaid with interest in 1983. In November 1983, the Dodge Caravan/Plymouth Voyager was introduced, establishing the minivan as a major category, and initiating Chrysler's return to stability.

In 1985, Diamond-Star Motors was created, further expanding the Chrysler-Mitsubishi relationship. In 1987, Chrysler acquired American Motors Corporation (AMC), which brought the profitable Jeep brand under the Chrysler umbrella.

In 1985, Chrysler entered an agreement with AMC to produce Chrysler M platform rear-drive, as well as Dodge Omnis front wheel drive cars, in AMC's Kenosha, Wisconsin, plant. In 1987, Chrysler acquired the 47% ownership of AMC that was held by Renault. The remaining outstanding shares of AMC were bought on the NYSE by August 5, 1987, making the deal valued somewhere between US$1.7 billion and US$2 billion, depending on how costs were counted. Chrysler CEO Lee Iacocca wanted the Jeep brand, particularly the Jeep Grand Cherokee (ZJ) that was under development, the new world-class manufacturing plant in Bramalea, Ontario, and AMC's engineering and management talent that became critical for Chrysler's future success. Chrysler established the Jeep/Eagle division as a "specialty" arm to market products distinctly different from the K-car-based products with the Eagle cars targeting import buyers. Former AMC dealers sold Jeep vehicles and various new Eagle models, as well as Chrysler products, strengthening the automaker's retail distribution system.

Eurostar, a joint venture between Chrysler and Steyr-Daimler-Puch, began producing the Chrysler Voyager in Austria for European markets in 1992.

1998–2007: DaimlerChrysler
In 1998, Chrysler and its subsidiaries entered into a partnership dubbed a "merger of equals" with German-based Daimler-Benz AG, creating the combined entity DaimlerChrysler AG. To the surprise of many stockholders, Daimler acquired Chrysler in a stock swap before Chrysler CEO Bob Eaton retired. Under DaimlerChrysler, the company was named DaimlerChrysler Motors Company LLC, with its U.S. operations generally called "DCX". The Eagle brand was retired soon after Chrysler's merger with Daimler-Benz in 1998 Jeep became a stand-alone division, and efforts were made to merge the Chrysler and Jeep brands as one sales unit. In 2001, the Plymouth brand was also discontinued.

Eurostar also built the Chrysler PT Cruiser in 2001 and 2002. The Austrian venture was sold to Magna International in 2002 and became Magna Steyr. The Voyager continued in production until 2007, whereas the Chrysler 300C, Jeep Grand Cherokee, and Jeep Commander were also built at the plant from 2005 until 2010.

On May 14, 2007, DaimlerChrysler announced the sale of 80.1% of Chrysler Group to American private equity firm Cerberus Capital Management, L.P., thereafter known as Chrysler LLC, although Daimler (renamed as Daimler AG) continued to hold a 19.9% stake.

2007–2014: Effects of Great Recession
The economic collapse during the Financial crisis of 2007–2008 pushed the company to the brink. On April 30, 2009, the automaker filed for Chapter 11 bankruptcy protection to be able to operate as a going concern, while renegotiating its debt structure and other obligations, which resulted in the corporation defaulting on over $4 billion in secured debts. The U.S. government described the company's action as a "prepackaged surgical bankruptcy".

On June 10, 2009, substantially all of Chrysler's assets were sold to "New Chrysler", organized as Chrysler Group LLC. The federal government provided support for the deal with US$8 billion in financing at nearly 21%. Under CEO Sergio Marchionne, "World Class Manufacturing" or WCM, a system of thorough manufacturing quality, was introduced and several products were re-launched with quality and luxury. The Ram, Jeep, Dodge, SRT, and Chrysler divisions were separated to focus on their own identity and brand, and 11 major model refreshes occurred in 21 months. The PT Cruiser, Nitro, Liberty and Caliber models (created during DCX) were discontinued. On May 24, 2011, Chrysler repaid its $7.6 billion loans to the United States and Canadian governments. The US Treasury, through the Troubled Asset Relief Program (TARP), invested $12.5 billion in Chrysler and recovered $11.2 billion when the company shares were sold in May 2011, resulting in a $1.3 billion loss. On July 21, 2011, Fiat bought the Chrysler shares held by the US Treasury. The purchase made Chrysler foreign-owned again, this time as the luxury division. The Chrysler 300 was badged Lancia Thema in some European markets (with additional engine options), giving Lancia a much-needed replacement for its flagship.

2014–2022: Fiat Chrysler Automobiles
On January 21, 2014, Fiat bought the remaining shares of Chrysler owned by the VEBA worth $3.65 billion. Several days later, the intended reorganization of Fiat and Chrysler under a new holding company, Fiat Chrysler Automobiles, together with a new FCA logo were announced. The most challenging launch for this new company came immediately in January 2014 with a completely redesigned Chrysler 200. The vehicle's creation is from the completely integrated company, FCA, executing from a global compact-wide platform.

On December 16, 2014, Chrysler Group LLC announced a name change to FCA US LLC.

On January 12, 2017, FCA shares traded at the New York Stock Exchange lost value after the EPA accused FCA US of using emissions cheating software to evade diesel-emissions tests, however the company countered the accusations, and the chairman and CEO Sergio Marchionne sternly rejected them. The following day, shares rose as investors played down the effect of the accusations. Analysts gave estimates of potential fines from several hundred million dollars to $4 billion, although the likelihood of a hefty fine was low. Senior United States Senator Bill Nelson urged the FTC to look into possible deceptive marketing of the company's diesel-powered SUVs. Shares dropped 2.2% after the announcement. FCA US would in 2022 plead guilty to a criminal charge of conspiring to defraud the US, to wire fraud, and to violate the Clean Air Act.

On July 21, 2018, Sergio Marchionne stepped down as chairman and CEO for health reasons, and was replaced by John Elkann and Michael Manley, respectively.

As a result of ending domestic production of more fuel-efficient passenger automobiles such as the Dodge Dart and Chrysler 200 sedans, FCA US elected to pay $77 million in fines for violating the anti-backsliding provision of fuel economy standards set under the Energy Independence and Security Act of 2007 for its model year 2016 fleet. It was again fined for the 2017 model year for not meeting the minimum domestic passenger car standard. FCA described the $79 million civil penalty as "not expected to have a material impact on its business."

As part of a January 2019 settlement, Fiat Chrysler was to recall and repair approximately 100,000 automobiles equipped with a 3.0-liter V6 EcoDiesel engine having a prohibited defeat device, pay $311 million in total civil penalties to US regulators and CARB, pay $72.5 million for state civil penalties, implement corporate governance reforms, and pay $33.5 million to mitigate excess pollution. The company was also to pay affected consumers up to $280 million and offer extended warranties on such vehicles worth $105 million. The total value of the settlement was about $800 million, though FCA did not admit liability, and it did not resolve an ongoing criminal investigation.

Logo evolution 
Emblems used by the Chrysler Corporation through the years:

Notes

Corporate governance

, management positions of Stellantis North America include:

Board of directors
 Mark Stewart, COO
 Michael J. Keegan, Chief Audit, Sustainability, and Compliance Officer
 Richard Palmer, CFO

Management team
 Jeffrey Kommor: head of US sales
 Lottie Holland: head of diversity, inclusion, and engagement, FCA - North America
 Bruno Cattori: president and CEO, FCA Mexico, S.A. de C.V.
 Mark Champine: head of quality, FCA - North America
 Mark Chernoby: chief technical compliance officer, Stellantis N.V.
 Martin Horneck: head of purchasing and supply chain management, FCA - North America
 Mamatha Chamarthi: chief information officer, FCA - North America and Asia Pacific
 Marissa Hunter: head of marketing
 Philip Langley: head of network development, FCA - North America
 Ralph Gilles: head of design
 Michael Resha: head of manufacturing, FCA - North America
 Roger "Shane" Karr: head of external affairs, FCA - North America
 Michael J. Keegan: chief audit; sustainability and compliance officer
 Michael Koval Jr.: brand chief executive officer, Ram Trucks
 Timothy Kuniskis: brand chief executive officer, Chrysler (interim), Dodge
 Jim Morisson: head of Jeep brand, FCA - North America
 João Laranjo: chief financial officer, FCA - North America
 Michael Bly: head of global propulsion systems, Stellantis N.V.
 Jeffrey P. Lux: head of transmission powertrain, FCA - North America
 Chris Pardi: general counsel and corporate secretary, FCA - North America
 Barbara J. Pilarski: head of business development, FCA - North America
 Mark Stewart: chief operating officer
 Scott Thiele: head of portfolio planning, FCA - North America; head of global long-range plan coordination
 Joseph Veltri: head of investor relations
 Rob Wichman: ad interim head of product development, FCA - North America
 Larry Dominique: senior vice president, Alfa Romeo - North America
 Christopher G. Fields: vice president, U.S. employee relations

Sales and marketing

United States sales
Chrysler is the smallest of the "Big Three" U.S. automakers (Stellantis North America, Ford Motor Company, and General Motors). In 2020, FCA US sold just over 1.8 million vehicles.

Global sales
Chrysler was the world's 11th largest vehicle manufacturer as ranked by OICA in 2012. Total Chrysler vehicle production was about 2.37 million that year.

Marketing

Lifetime powertrain warranty
In 2007, Chrysler began to offer vehicle lifetime powertrain warranty for the first registered owner or retail lessee. The deal covered owner or lessee in U.S., Puerto Rico, and the Virgin Islands, for 2009 model year vehicles, and 2006, 2007, and 2008 model year vehicles purchased on or after July 26, 2007. Covered vehicles excluded SRT models, Diesel vehicles, Sprinter models, Ram Chassis Cab, Hybrid System components (including transmission), and certain fleet vehicles. The warranty is non-transferable. After Chrysler's restructuring, the warranty program was replaced by five-year/100,000 mile transferable warranty for 2010 or later vehicles.

"Let's Refuel America"
In 2008, as a response to customer feedback citing the prospect of rising gas prices as a top concern, Chrysler launched the "Let's Refuel America" incentive campaign, which guaranteed new-car buyers a gasoline price of $2.99 for three years. With the U.S. purchase of eligible Chrysler, Jeep, and Dodge vehicles, customers could enroll in the program and receive a gas card that immediately lowers their gas price to $2.99 a gallon, and keeps it there for the three years.

Lancia co-branding
Chrysler plans for Lancia to codevelop products, with some vehicles being shared. Olivier Francois, Lancia's CEO, was appointed to the Chrysler division in October 2009. Francois plans to reestablish the Chrysler brand as an upscale brand.

Ram trucks
In October 2009, Dodge's car and truck lines were separated, with the name "Dodge" being used for cars, minivans, and crossovers and "Ram" for light- and medium-duty trucks and other commercial-use vehicles.

"Imported From Detroit"
In 2011, Chrysler unveiled their "Imported From Detroit" campaign with ads featuring Detroit rapper Eminem, one of which aired during the Super Bowl. The campaign highlighted the rejuvenation of the entire product lineup, which included the new, redesigned, and repackaged 2011 model year 200 sedans and 200 convertibles, the Chrysler 300 sedan, and the Chrysler Town & Country minivan. As part of the campaign, Chrysler sold a line of clothing items featuring the Monument to Joe Louis, with proceeds being funneled to Detroit-area charities, including the Boys and Girls Clubs of Southeast Michigan, Habitat for Humanity Detroit and the Marshall Mathers Foundation.

In March 2011, Chrysler Group LLC filed a lawsuit against Moda Group LLC (owner of Pure Detroit clothing retailer) for copying and selling merchandise with the "Imported from Detroit" slogan. Chrysler claimed it had notified defendant of its pending trademark application February 14, but the defendant argued Chrysler had not secured a trademark for the "Imported From Detroit" phrase. On June 18, 2011, U.S. District Judge Arthur Tarnow ruled that Chrysler's request did not show that it would suffer irreparable harm or that it had a strong likelihood of winning its case. Therefore, Pure Detroit's owner, Detroit retailer Moda Group LLC, can continue selling its "Imported from Detroit" products. Tarnow also noted that Chrysler does not have a trademark on "Imported from Detroit" and rejected the automaker's argument that trademark law is not applicable to the case. In March 2012, Chrysler Group LLC and Pure Detroit agreed to a March 27 mediation to try to settle the lawsuit over the clothing company's use of "Imported from Detroit" slogan. Pure Detroit stated that Chrysler has made false claims about the origins of three vehicles - Chrysler 200, Chrysler 300 and Chrysler Town & Country - none of which are built in Detroit. Pure Detroit also said that Chrysler's Imported From Detroit merchandise is not being made in Detroit. In 2012 Chrysler and Pure Detroit came to an undisclosed settlement.

Chrysler's Jefferson North Assembly, which makes the Jeep Grand Cherokee and Dodge Durango, is the only car manufacturing plant of any company remaining entirely in Detroit (General Motors operates a plant that is partly in Detroit and partly in Hamtramck).

In 2011, Eminem settled a lawsuit against Audi alleging the defendant had ripped off the Chrysler 300 Super Bowl commercial in the Audi A6 Avant ad.

"Halftime in America"

Again in 2012, Chrysler advertised during the Super Bowl. Its two-minute February 5, 2012 Super Bowl XLVI advertisement was titled "Halftime in America". The ad drew criticism from several leading U.S. conservatives, who suggested that its messaging implied that President Barack Obama deserved a second term and, as such, was political payback for Obama's support for the federal bailout of the company. Asked about the criticism in a 60 Minutes interview with Steve Kroft, Sergio Marchionne responded "just to rectify the record I paid back the loans at 19.7% Interest. I don't think I committed to do to a commercial on top of that" and characterized the Republican reaction as "unnecessary and out of place".

America's Import

In 2014, Chrysler started using a new slogan, "America's Import" in ads introducing their all-new 2015 Chrysler 200, targeting foreign automakers from Germany to Japan with such ads (German performance and Japanese quality), and at the ending of selected ads, the advertisement will say, "We Built This", indicating being built in America, instead of overseas.

Slogans
 Engineered to the Power of Cars (1998–2001)
 Drive = Love (2002–2004)
 Inspiration comes standard (2004–2007)
 Engineered Beautifully (2007–mid 2010)
 Imported From Detroit (2011–2014)
 America's Import (2014–2016)

Product line

Chrysler Uconnect
First introduced as MyGig, Chrysler Uconnect is a system that brings interactive ability to the in-car radio and telemetric-like controls to car settings. As of mid-2015, it was installed in hundreds of thousands of Fiat Chrysler vehicles. It connects to the Internet via the mobile network of AT&T, providing the car with its own IP address. Internet connectivity using any Chrysler, Dodge, Jeep or Ram vehicle, via a Wi-Fi "hot-spot", is also available via Uconnect Web. Uconnect is available on several current and was available on several discontinued Chrysler models including the current Dodge Dart, Chrysler 300, Aspen, Sebring, Town and Country, Dodge Avenger, Caliber, Grand Caravan, Challenger, Charger, Journey, Nitro, and Ram.

In July 2015, IT security researchers announced a severe security flaw assumed to affect every Chrysler vehicle with Uconnect produced from late 2013 to early 2015. It allows hackers to gain access to the car over the Internet, and in the case of a Jeep Cherokee was demonstrated to enable an attacker to take control not just of the radio, A/C, and windshield wipers, but also of the car's steering, brakes and transmission. Chrysler published a patch that car owners can download and install via a USB stick, or have a car dealer install for them.

Brands 
Current and former brands of Stellantis North America:

Current

Former 

Notes

Brand predecessors

Maxwell-Chalmers 
 Maxwell (1904–1926), US: New Models renamed Chrysler and Plymouth.
 Chalmers (1908–1923):US High-end Luxury Cars, Merged with Maxwell 1922.

United States Motor Company 
(1908–1913): Reorganized and folded into Maxwell.

 Brush (1907–1913)
 Dayton (1905–1913)
 Alden-Sampson (1910–1913)
 Columbia (1899–1910)
 Riker (1897–1907)
Electric Vehicle Company (1899–1907)
 Argo
 Hackett
 Lorraine
 Detroit
 Thomas (1906–1908)
 Sampson (1903-1913)
 Stoddard
 Courier (1909-1913)
 Providence
 Gray Marine Motor Company

The Chrysler Corporation 
 Graham Brothers (1916–1929), Trucks- (acquired by The Dodge Brothers Company in 1925 with the passenger car division split to form Graham-Paige): folded into Dodge brand after Chrysler's ownership.
 Fargo (1913-1935) US, (1920–1972) Canada-Trucks and Vans, Replaced by Plymouth Trucks in the US in 1937 and folded into the Dodge Division after 1972 in Canada.

Rootes Group
(1913-1971), UK: Minority interest purchased by Chrysler in 1964, progressively taking controlling interest in 1967, renamed Chrysler Europe in 1971.

 Sunbeam (1901–1976), UK
 Humber (1898–1976), UK
 Singer (1905–1970), UK
 Commer (1905–1979), UK
 Hillman (1907–1976), UK
 Karrier (1908–1977), UK
 Talbot (1903–1958; 1979–1994), UK
 Simca (1934–1977), France
 Barreiros (1959–1978), Spain

American Motors Corporation
(1954–1988), US: Purchased by Chrysler and renamed Jeep-Eagle Division.
 AMC (Brand), (1967-1987) US: rebranded Eagle.
 Hudson (1909–1957), US
 Aerocar (1905-1908) US, Brand discontinued and Reorganized into Hudson Motors.
 Essex (1918–1933), US: Folded into the main Hudson line.
 Terraplane (1932–1938), US
 Nash (1917–1957), US
 Jeffery (1903-1917), US: Line Dissolved and Renamed Nash in 1915.
 LaFayette (1919–1940) US: Folded into Nash
 Ajax (1925–1926), US
 Mitchell (1903-1923), US purchased and renamed Ajax.
 Rambler (1900–1914 ; 1950–1969), US
 Metropolitan (1959–1962), US
 AM General US 1970–1983. The former contract division of AMC

Kaiser Motors Corporation
 Kaiser (1946–1955)Entry level(Renamed Willys-Kaiser Motors, then to Kaiser-Jeep Corporation) Purchased by AMC in 1970. 
 Frazer (1946–1951)US- Entry level Luxury, Discontinued models incorporated in Kaiser Line.

Graham-Paige
(1927–1947), Mid-priced cars - Purchased by Henry Kaiser and reorganized into Kaiser-Frazer Motors.
 Paige-Detroit (1908-1928)
 Jewett (1922-1926)

Willys-Overland Motors
(1912-1963) US. Acquired by Kaiser Motors, later Kaiser Jeep, then by AMC in 1970
 Willys (1908–1955) US. Withdrawn from the US market in 1955. Used as a Jeep Wrangler trim level.
 Overland (1903-1926) US. Acquired by Willys Motors in 1912. Has been used as a Jeep trim level since 2002.
 Russell (1904-1916) Canada 
 Curtiss (1917-1920)US, Sold to Clement M. Keys and merged with Wright Aeronautical.
 Stearns-Knight (1898-1929) US, purchased by Willys in 1925.

Chrysler brand 

The Chrysler brand has mostly been Chrysler's premium brand competing with brands such as Cadillac, Packard, Cord and Lincoln. After the corporation decided to spin Imperial off as a separate brand in 1955 to better compete with Cadillac and Lincoln, Chrysler became the corporation's number two brand, but still offered luxury and near-luxury products. After the Imperial brand was dropped in 1983, Chrysler once again became the top brand.

Early history
The first Chrysler cars were introduced on January 5, 1924, at the New York Automobile Show — one year before Chrysler Corporation itself was created. These cars, launched by Maxwell Motors, had a new high-compression six-cylinder, a seven-bearing crankshaft, carburetor air cleaner, replaceable oil filter, and four-wheel hydraulic brakes. Features like this had never been offered in a medium-priced car before, and the 32,000 first-year record sales proved the popularity of this model.

In 1926, Chrysler Introduces the Chrysler 70 named for its ability to hit 70 MPH. In 1927, Chrysler had four models the Chrysler 50, 60, 70, and Imperial 80. Chrysler was in fourth place in sales with 192,082 units delivered. In 1928 Chrysler invested $23 million to expand its plants.

1930s
In 1930, Chrysler began wiring the Chrysler Model 70 and 77 for radios. Chrysler also became the first car to offer the downdraft carburetor on its models. With the new carburetor, Chrysler also received a new cam-driven fuel pump. For the 1931 model, Chrysler received new radiator grilles, a new inline 8 engine, and automatic spark control. The 1932 Chryslers introduced the Floating Power rubber engine mounts which eliminated further vibrations from the chassis. A vacuum-controlled automatic clutch, Oilite bearings and the first universal joints with roller bearings were also added. In 1933 Chrysler models received a host of new improvements including a new three-speed manual transmission that used helical gears- for silent use. Chrysler engines received new alloy valve seats for better reliability, along with new spring shackles which improved lubrication. In 1934 the Chrysler 6 introduced an independent front coil spring suspension and received vent windows that rolled down with the side glass. Chrysler also introduced its revolutionary Chrysler Airflow, which included a welded Unibody, a wind-tunnel-designed aerodynamic body for a better power to power ratio, and better handling. In 1935 Chrysler introduced the Plymouth-based Chrysler Airstream Six which gave customers an economical modern alternative to the radically styled Airflows. The Airflow received an updated front hood and grille for 1935. For 1936, the Chrysler Airflow received an enlarged luggage compartment, a new roof, and a new adjustable front seat. The Airstream Six and Eight of the previous year were renamed the Chrysler Six and Deluxe Eight. The Automatic overdrive was optional to both cars. For 1937 the Airflow cars were mostly discontinued besides the C-17 Airflow, which received a final facelift. Only 4600 C-17 Airflows were built for 1937. The Chrysler Six and Chrysler Eight were respectively renamed the Royal and Imperial and gained isolated rubber body mounts to remove road vibrations. In 1938 the Chrysler Royal received the new 95 HP Gold Seal Inline 6. In 1939 Chrysler unveiled Superfinish a process in which all major chassis components subject to wear were finished to a mirror-like surface. Other features new to Chrysler were push-button door locks and rotary-type door latches.

1940s
For 1940 Chrysler introduced sealed beam headlights on its cars which in turn improved night visibility by 50%. Mid-year in 1940 Chrysler introduced the Highlander as a special edition featuring popular features and Scottish plaid interior. The luxury sport model, called the Saratoga was also added to the New Yorker range as the Imperial became the exclusive limousine model. In 1941 Chrysler introduces the Fluid Drive semi-automatic transmission. 1942 Chryslers were redesigned with a wrap-a-round chrome grille and concealed running boards for this abbreviated model year, civilian production stopped by February 1942. For 1946 Chrysler redesigned the 1942 cars and reintroduced the Town & Country. In 1949, Chrysler came out with the first all-new redesign in almost a decade. In 1949 Chrysler moved the ignition to key only instead of having a key and push-button, they also reintroduced the nine-passenger station wagon body style to the line.

1950s
For 1950 Chrysler updated the overly conservative 1949 models by lowering cars slightly, updating the grille to appear more simple, replacing the chrome fin tail lamps with flush units, and removing the third brake light from the trunk lid. Also in 1950, Chrysler introduced disc brakes on the Imperial, the new Chrysler Newport hardtop, power windows, and the padded safety dash. Chrysler introduced their first overhead-valve, high-compression V8 engine in 1951, Displacing 331 cubic inches, it was rated at 180 bhp, 20 more horsepower than the new-for-1949 Cadillac V8. It was unique as the only American V8 engine designed with hemispherical combustion chambers. After successfully winning Mexican Road Races, the engine was upgraded to 250 bhp by 1955. Although Chrysler didn't build a small sporty car (such as the Chevrolet Corvette and the Ford Thunderbird), they decided to build a unique sporting car based on the New Yorker hardtop coupe, that featured a 300-bhp "Hemi" V8. To add to the car's uniqueness, the car was given a grille from the Imperial, and side trim from the less-adorned Windsor. A PowerFlite 2-speed automatic transmission was the only available gearbox. It was marketed as the Chrysler 300, emphasizing the engine's horsepower, continuing a luxury sport approach introduced earlier with the Chrysler Saratoga.

A 1955 restyle by newly hired Virgil Exner saw a dramatic rise in Chrysler sales, which rose even more in 1957, when the entire line was dramatically restyled a second time with a sloping front end and high-flying tailfins at the rear. Although well received at first, it soon became apparent that quality control was compromised to get the new cars to market on an accelerated schedule. In 1957 all Chrysler products were installed with Torsion-Aire front suspension, which was a Torsion bar suspension only for the front wheels that followed two years after Packard installed Torsion-Level suspension on both the front and rear wheels.

Sales of all Chrysler models plummeted in 1958 and 1959 despite improvements in quality. Throughout the mid-and late-1950s, Chryslers were available in top-line New Yorker, mid-line Saratoga, and base Windsor series. Exner's designs for the Chrysler brand in the early 1960s were overblown versions of the late 1950s, which were unhelpful in sales. Exner left his post by 1962, leaving Elwood Engel, a recent transfer from Ford Motor Co, in charge of Chrysler styling.

1960s
Although early 1960s Chrysler cars reflected Virgil Exner's exaggerated styling, Elwood Engel's influence was evident as early as 1963, when a restyled, trimmer, boxier Chrysler was introduced. The Desoto lines along with the Windsor and Saratoga series were replaced with the Newport, while New Yorker continued as the luxury model, while Imperial continued to be the top-of-the-line brand. The Chrysler 300, officially part of the New Yorker product line, continued in production as a high-performance coupe through 1965, adding a different letter of the alphabet for each year of production, starting with the 300-B of 1956, through the 300-L of 1965. 1962 saw a "non-letter" 300 which was lower in price but was equipped with downgraded standard equipment. The '65 Chryslers were again dramatically restyled, with a thoroughly modern unit body and larger engines up to 440 cubic inches. They were squared off and slab-sided, with optional glass-covered headlamps that retracted when the headlights were turned on and a swept-back roofline for 2-door hardtop models. Chryslers through the 1960s were well-built, quality cars with innovative features such as unit bodies and front torsion bar suspension, and in 1963 Bob Hope was a spokesperson of The Chrysler Theatre, the same year the Chrysler Turbine Car was introduced.

1970s
The Cordoba was introduced by Chrysler for the 1975 model year as an upscale personal luxury car that replaced the 300, competing with the Oldsmobile Cutlass, Buick Regal, and Mercury Cougar. The Cordoba was originally intended to be a Plymouth—the names Mirada, Premier, Sebring, and Grand Era were associated with the project; all except Grand Era would be used on later Chrysler, Dodge, and Eagle vehicles, though only the Dodge Mirada would be related to the Cordoba. However, losses from the newly introduced full-size C-body models due to the 1973 oil crisis, along with the investment in the Turbine Car that didn't produce a product to sell encouraged Chrysler executives to seek higher profits by marketing the model under the more upscale Chrysler brand.

The car was a success, with over 150,000 examples sold in 1975, a sales year that was otherwise dismal for the company. For the 1976 model year, sales increased slightly to 165,000. The mildly revised 1977 version also sold well, with just under 140,000 cars. The success of using the Chrysler nameplate strategy is contrasted to sales of its similar and somewhat cheaper corporate cousin, the Dodge Charger SE. Interiors were more luxurious than the Dodge Charger SE and much more than the top-line standard intermediates (Plymouth Fury, Dodge Coronet) with a velour cloth notchback bench seat and folding armrest standard. Optionally available were bucket seats upholstered in Corinthian leather with a center armrest and cushion, or at extra cost, a center console with floor shifter and storage compartment.

In 1977, Chrysler brought out a new mid-size line of cars called LeBaron (a name previously used for an Imperial model) which included a coupe, sedan, and station wagon.

1980s
For 1982, the LeBaron moved to the front-wheel drive Chrysler K platform, where it was the upscale brand's lowest-priced offering. It was initially available in just sedan and coupe versions. In early 1982, it was released in a convertible version, bringing to the market the first factory-built open-topped domestic vehicle since the 1976 Cadillac Eldorado. A station wagon version called the Town and Country was added as well. A special Town and Country convertible was also made from 1983 until 1986 in limited quantities (1,105 total), which like the wagon featured simulated wood paneling that made it resemble the original 1940s Town and Country. This model was part of the well-equipped Mark Cross option package for the latter years.

In 1982 the R-body line was discontinued and the New Yorker nameplate transferred to the smaller M-body line. Up to this point, the Chrysler M-body entry had been sold as LeBaron, but that name was moved to a new K-car-based FWD line (refer to the Chrysler LeBaron article for information on the 1977-81 M-bodies). Following the nameplate swap, the M-body line was consolidated and simplified. 360 V8 engines were gone, as were coupes and station wagons (the K-car LeBaron's coupe and wagon replaced them). The Fifth Avenue option was still available as a $1,244 option package. It was adapted from the earlier LeBaron's package, with a distinctive vinyl roof, electroluminescent opera lamps, and a rear fascia adapted from the Dodge Diplomat. Interiors featured button-tufted, pillow-soft seats covered in either "Kimberley velvet" or "Corinthian leather", choices that would continue unchanged throughout the car's run. In addition, the carpet was thicker than that offered in the base New Yorker, Diplomat and Gran Fury/Caravelle Salon, and the interior had more chrome trim.

1983 was the last year for Chrysler's Cordoba coupe. Also in 1983, Chrysler introduced a new front-wheel-drive New Yorker model based on a stretched K-Car platform. Additionally, a less expensive, less equipped version of the new New Yorker was sold as the Chrysler E-Class in 1983 and 1984. More upscale stretched K-Car models were also sold as Chrysler Executive sedans and limousines.

For 1984, the New Yorker Fifth Avenue was now simply called Fifth Avenue, setting the name that would continue for six successful years. Fifth Avenue production was moved from Windsor, Ontario, to St. Louis, Missouri. Beginning in late 1986 through the 1989 model year, they were manufactured at the American Motors plant in Kenosha, Wisconsin (purchased by Chrysler in 1987). The Fifth Avenue also far outsold its Dodge Diplomat and Plymouth Gran Fury siblings, with a much greater proportion of sales going to private customers, despite its higher price tag. Production peaked at 118,000 cars for 1986 and the Fifth Avenue stood out in a by-now K-car dominated lineup as Chrysler's lone concession to traditional RWD American sedans.

Chrysler introduced a new mid-size four-door hatchback model for 1985 under the LeBaron GTS nameplate. It was sold alongside the mid-size LeBaron sedan, coupe, convertible, and station wagon. The LeBaron coupe and convertible were redesigned for 1987. Unlike previous LeBarons, this new coupe and convertible had unique styling instead of being just two-door versions of the sedan. The new design featured hidden headlamps (through 1992) and full-width taillights.

The New Yorker was redesigned for the 1988 model year and now included a standard V6 engine. This generation New Yorker also saw the return of hidden headlamps which had not been available on the New Yorker since the 1981 R-body version. In 1989, Chrysler brought out the TC by Maserati luxury roadster as a more affordable alternative to Cadillac's Allante. It was a joint venture model between Chrysler and Maserati.

1990s

Chrysler re-introduced the Town & Country nameplate in the calendar year 1989 as a luxury rebadged variant of the Dodge Grand Caravan/Plymouth Grand Voyager minivan for the 1990 model year and continued to sell this incarnation of the Chrysler Town & Country until the end of the 2016 model year when Chrysler reintroduced the Pacifica nameplate for their minivan in the calendar year 2016 for the 2017 model year run. 1990 saw the previous relationship between New Yorker and Fifth Avenue return, as the Fifth Avenue became a model of the New Yorker. There was some substantive difference, however, as the New Yorker Fifth Avenue used a slightly longer chassis than the standard car. The new New Yorker Fifth Avenue's larger interior volume classified it as a full-size model this time; despite having smaller exterior dimensions than the first generation. For 1990, Chrysler's new 3.3L V6 engine was the standard and only choice, teamed with the company's A-604 four-speed electronic automatic transaxle. Beginning in 1991, a larger 3.8L V6 became optional. It delivered the same 147 horsepower as the 3.3, but had more torque.

The New Yorker Fifth Avenue's famous seats, long noted for their button-tufted appearance and sofa-like comfort, continued to be offered with the customer's choice of velour or leather, with the former "Corinthian leather" replaced by that of the Mark Cross company. Leather-equipped cars bore the Mark Cross logo on the seats and, externally, on an emblem attached to the brushed aluminum band ahead of the rear door opera windows. In this form, the New Yorker Fifth Avenue resembled the newly revived Chrysler Imperial, although some much-needed distinction was provided between the cars when the New Yorker Fifth Avenue (along with its New Yorker Salon linemate) received restyled, rounded-off front and rear ends for the 1992 model year, while the Imperial continued in its original crisply-lined form.

The early 1990s saw a revival of the Imperial as a high-end sedan in Chrysler's lineup. Unlike the 1955–1983 Imperial, this car was a model of Chrysler, not its own marque. Based on the Y platform, it represented the top full-size model in Chrysler's lineup; below it was the similar New Yorker Fifth Avenue, and below that was the shorter wheelbase New Yorker. The reintroduction of the Imperial was two years after the Lincoln Continental was changed to a front-wheel-drive sedan with a V6 engine. Other domestic competitors in this segment included the Cadillac Sedan de Ville/Fleetwood, Oldsmobile 98, and Buick Electra/Park Avenue. Though closely related, the Imperial differed from the New Yorker Fifth Avenue in many ways. The Imperial's nose was more wedge-shaped, while the New Yorker Fifth Avenue's had a sharper, more angular profile (the New Yorker Fifth Avenue was later restyled with a more rounded front end). The rears of the two cars also differed. Like the front, the New Yorker Fifth Avenue's rear came to stiffer angles while the Imperial's rear-end came to more rounded edges. Also found on the Imperial were full-width taillights which were similar to those of the Chrysler TC, as well as the early 1980s Imperial coupe, while the New Yorker Fifth Avenue came with smaller vertical taillights.

For 1991, the 3.3L V6 was replaced by the larger 3.8L EGH V6. A four-speed automatic transmission was standard with both engines.

Also new for 1990 was a redesigned LeBaron sedan which offered a standard V6 engine. Later models would also be available with 4 cylinder engines.

The Town & Country minivan was restyled for 1991 in conjunction with the restyling of the Dodge and Plymouth minivan models. 1991 would also be the last year for the TC by Maserati, leaving the LeBaron as the brand's sole coupe and convertible options.

The first generation of the Chrysler Concorde debuted at the 1992 North American International Auto Show in Detroit as a 1993 model. It debuted as a single, well-equipped model with a base price of US$18,341. Out of all the LH sedans, the first generation Concorde was most closely related to the Eagle Vision. The Concorde was given a more traditional image than the Vision. The two shared nearly all sheet metal in common with the main differences limited to their grilles, rear fascias, bodyside moldings, and wheel choices. The Concorde featured a modern take on Chrysler's signature waterfall grille. It was split into six sections divided by body-colored strips with the Chrysler Pentastar logo on the center strip. The Concorde's rear fascia was highlighted by a full-width and full-height lightbar between the taillights, giving the appearance that the taillights stretched across the entire trunk. In keeping with its upscale position, Concorde's body side moldings incorporated bright chrome (later golden colored) work not found on its Dodge or Eagle siblings. On Concordes with gray lower body paint color, the gray came all the way up to the chrome beltline; on Visions, the gray lower body paint area was smaller and much more subtle. Wheel styles, which included available aluminum wheels with a Spiralcast design, were also unique to the Chrysler LH sedans (Concorde, LHS, New Yorker); Dodge and Eagle had their own different wheel styles.

Introduced in May 1993 for the 1994 model year, the Chrysler LHS was the top-of-the-line model for the division, as well as the most expensive of the Chrysler LH platform cars. All the LH-series models shared a  wheelbase and were developed using Chrysler's new computer drafting system. The car was differentiated from the division's New Yorker sedan by its bucket leather seats (the New Yorker had a bench seat) and standard features such as alloy wheels that were options on the New Yorker. Further differences between the Chrysler LHS and its New Yorker counterpart were a floor console and shifter, five-passenger seating, lack of chrome trim, an upgraded interior and a sportier image. The New Yorker was dropped after the 1996 model year in favor of a six-passenger option on the LHS. The LHS received a minor face change in 1995 when the corporate-wide Pentastar emblem was replaced with the revived Chrysler brand emblem. Standard features of the LHS included a 3.5L EGE 24-valve  V6 engine, body-colored grille, side mirrors and trim, traction control, aluminum wheels, integrated fog lights, 8-way power-adjustable front seats, premium sound systems with amplifiers, and automatic temperature control. Unlike the New Yorker, leather seats were standard.

The final generation of the New Yorker continued with front-wheel drive on an elongated version of the new Chrysler LH platform and was released in May 1993 along with the nearly identical Chrysler LHS as an early 1994 model, eight months after the original LH cars: the Chrysler Concorde, Dodge Intrepid, and Eagle Vision, were introduced. The New Yorker came standard with the 3.5L EGE which produced . Chrysler gave the New Yorker a more "traditional American" luxury image, and the LHS a more European performance image (as was done with the Eagle Vision). Little separated New Yorker from LHS in appearance, with New Yorker's chrome hood trim, body-color cladding, standard chrome wheel covers, and 15-inch wheels, column shifter, and front bench seat, being the only noticeable differences. An option provided for 16-inch wheels and a firmer suspension type ("touring suspension"). This option eliminated the technical differences between New Yorker and LHS. LHS came with almost all of New Yorker's optional features as standard equipment and featured the firmer tuned suspension, to go with its more European image.

During the 1994 model run, various changes were made to the New Yorker. On the outside, New Yorker was switched to new accent-color body cladding, whereas LHS received body-color cladding. This change aligned New Yorker with the Chrysler Concorde which also had accent-color cladding. Instead of standard 15-inch and optional 16-inch wheels, for the sake of enhanced stability 16-inch wheels became standard and the 15-inch versions were dropped. Likewise, the touring suspension option available on early 1994 New Yorker models was discontinued, leaving only "ride-tuned" suspension.

In 1995, the Chrysler Sebring was introduced as a coupe, replacing the LeBaron coupe, and the new JA platform Chrysler Cirrus replaced the outgoing LeBaron sedan. A year later, a convertible version of the Sebring went on the market and replaced the LeBaron convertible. In 1999, Chrysler introduced the new LH platform 300M sedan alongside a redesigned LHS. The 300M was originally designed to be the next-generation Eagle Vision but since the Eagle brand had been discontinued in 1998, it instead became a Chrysler sedan.

2000s
In 2000, the Voyager and Grand Voyager minivans were repositioned as Chrysler models due to the phasing out of the Plymouth brand. In 2001, a sedan was added to the Sebring model line and served as a replacement for the discontinued Cirrus. That same year, the Chrysler brand added a retro-styled PT Cruiser as well as the Prowler roadster which had previously been a Plymouth model. By 2004, all Chrysler brand minivans were now sold under the Town & Country nameplate.

The 2000s also saw the Chrysler brand move into the fast-growing crossover/SUV segment with the introduction of the Chrysler Pacifica crossover in 2004, and the Chrysler Aspen SUV in 2007. The Pacifica would be discontinued in 2008 (the nameplate would return on a new minivan model in 2017) and the Aspen would be discontinued in 2009.

Between 2004 and 2008, Chrysler offered a two-seat coupe and convertible model called Crossfire. This was in addition to Chrysler's five-seat Sebring coupe (through 2005) and four-seat convertible being sold at the time.

In 2005, Chrysler introduced the LX platform Chrysler 300 sedan which replaced both the 300M and Concorde. It was the brand's first rear-wheel-drive sedan since the discontinuation of the Chrysler Fifth Avenue in 1989. It was also the first time a Chrysler sedan was available with a V8 engine since 1989.

2010s
Following FCA's acquisition of Chrysler, FCA set a long-term goal of reviving the Chrysler brand as a full luxury brand to compete again with Cadillac and other luxury brands. The company announced in October 2009 that future plans for Chrysler brand vehicles include closer cooperation and shared development between Chrysler and Lancia, an upscale Italian automaker within the Fiat Group. In 2011, the brand's winged emblem was modified, eliminating the historic blue ribbon center which dated from the 1930s, replacing it with a blue-backed "Chrysler" nameplate. Also that year, the Chrysler 300 was restyled and the Sebring was rebranded as the Chrysler 200. In May 2014, FCA announced it would make the brand a mainstream brand with premium features. A redesigned Chrysler 200 was introduced for 2015 as a sedan only, but would be discontinued in 2017 as FCA shifted focus more towards SUVs and minivans. For 2017, the Chrysler Pacifica nameplate returned on a new minivan, replacing the long-running Town & Country.

In 2010, Fiat Auto was planning to sell seven of its vehicles in the U.S. by 2014, while Fiat-controlled Chrysler Group was to supply nine models to sell under Fiat brands in the European market, according to a five-year plan rolled out on April 21, 2010, in Turin, Italy, by Fiat and Chrysler CEO Sergio Marchionne. At least five of the Fiat Auto models were expected to be marketed in the U.S. under its Alfa Romeo brand. Showing the level of integration envisioned, a product introduction timeline envisaged Chrysler-built compact and full-size SUVs going on sale in 2012 and 2014, respectively, in both European and North American markets.

During this time, Chrysler's quality and customer satisfaction ratings had been below average according to Consumer Reports and J.D. Power since the late 1990s. Chrysler did have a few quality successes during this period. Strategic Vision named Chrysler an overall winner in 2015, for strong customer appeal, and with the rise in quality of all cars the difference between high and low "problem-counting" ratings are relatively small.

2020s
The low-end L and LX models were separated from the Pacifica line and sold under the Voyager nameplate starting with the 2020 model year. Additionally, a fleet-only Voyager LXi version was added.

The brand's current lineup consists of the Chrysler 300, Chrysler Pacifica and Chrysler Voyager.

Environmental initiatives
Chrysler produced an experimental electric vehicle in 1979, the company developed Chrysler ETV-1 electric prototype in cooperation with U.S. Department of Energy.

In 1992, Chrysler developed the Dodge EPIC concept minivan. In 1993, Chrysler began to sell a limited-production electric minivan called the TEVan; however, only 56 were produced. In 1997, a second generation, called the EPIC, was released. It was discontinued after 1999.

Chrysler once owned the Global Electric Motorcars company, building low-speed neighborhood electric vehicles, but sold GEM to Polaris Industries in 2011.

In September 2007, Chrysler established ENVI, an in-house organization focused on electric-drive vehicles and related technologies which was disbanded by late 2009. In August 2009, Chrysler took US$70 million in grants from the U.S. Department of Energy to develop a test fleet of 220 hybrid pickup trucks and minivans.

The first hybrid models, the Chrysler Aspen hybrid and the Dodge Durango hybrid, were discontinued a few months after production in 2008, sharing their GM-designed hybrid technology with GM, Daimler and BMW.

Chrysler is on the Advisory Council of the PHEV Research Center, and undertook a government sponsored demonstration project with Ram and minivan vehicles.

In 2012, FCA CEO Sergio Marchionne said that Chrysler and Fiat both plan to focus primarily on alternative fuels, such as CNG and Diesel, instead of hybrid and electric drivetrains for their consumer products.

Fiat Chrysler bought a total of 8.2 million megagrams of U.S. greenhouse gas emission credits from competitors including Toyota, Honda, Tesla and Nissan for the 2010, 2011, 2013, and 2014 model years. It had the worst fleet average fuel economy among major manufacturers selling in the US from model years 2012–2021.

Chrysler Defense

The dedicated tank building division of Chrysler, this division was founded as the Chrysler Tank division in 1940, originally with the intention of providing another production line for the M2 Medium Tank, so that the U.S. Army could more rapidly build up its inventory of the type. Its first plant was the Detroit Arsenal Tank Plant. When the M2A1 was unexpectedly declared obsolete in August of the same year, plans were altered (though not without considerable difficulty) to produce the M3 Grant instead, primarily for the British as part of the United States under the counter support for Great Britain against Nazi Germany (the U.S. not yet being formally in the war), with the balance of the revised order going to the U.S. Army as the Lee. After December 1941 and the United States' entry into the war against the Axis powers, the Tank division rapidly expanded, with new facilities such as the Tank Arsenal Proving Ground at (then) Utica, Michigan. It also quickly widened the range of products it was developing and producing, including the M4 Sherman tank and the Chrysler A57 multibank tank engine.

Special programs
During World War II, essentially all of Chrysler's facilities were devoted to building military vehicles (the Jeep brand came later, after Chrysler acquired American Motors Corporation). They were also designing V12 and V16 hemi-engines producing  for airplanes, but they did not make it into production as jets were developed and were seen as the future for air travel. During the 1950s Cold War period, Chrysler made air raid sirens powered by its Hemi V-8 engines.

Radar antennas
When the Radiation Laboratory at MIT was established in 1941 to develop microwave radars, one of the first projects resulted in the SCR-584, the most widely recognized radar system of the war era. This system included a parabolic antenna six feet in diameter that was mechanically aimed in a helical pattern (round and round as well as up and down).

One of Chrysler's most significant contributions to the war effort was in radar technology. For the final production design of this antenna and its highly complex drive mechanism, the Army's Signal Corps Laboratories turned to Chrysler's Central Engineering Office. There, the parabola was changed from aluminum to steel, allowing production to form using standard automotive presses. To keep weight down, 6,000 equally spaced holes were drilled in the face (this had no effect on the radiation pattern). The drive mechanism was completely redesigned, using technology derived from Chrysler's research in automotive gears and differentials. The changes resulted in improved performance, reduced weight, and easier maintenance. A large portion of the Dodge plant was used in building 1,500 of the SCR-584 antennas as well as the vans used in the systems.

Aircraft
 Chrysler VZ-6

Missiles
In April 1950, the U.S. Army established the Ordnance Guided Missile Center (OGMC) at Redstone Arsenal, adjacent to Huntsville, Alabama. To form OGMC, over 1,000 civilian and military personnel were transferred from Fort Bliss, Texas. Included was a group of German scientists and engineers led by Wernher von Braun; this group had been brought to America under Project Paperclip. OGMC designed the Army's first short-range ballistic missile, the PGM-11 Redstone, based on the WWII German V-2 missile. Chrysler established the Missile Division to serve as the Redstone prime contractor, setting up an engineering operation in Huntsville and for production obtaining use from the U.S. Navy of a large plant in Sterling Heights, Michigan. The Redstone was in active service from 1958 until 1964; it was also the first missile to test-launch a live nuclear weapon, first detonated in a 1958 test in the South Pacific.

Working together, the Missile Division and von Braun's team greatly increased the capability of the Redstone, resulting in the PGM-19 Jupiter, a medium-range ballistic missile. In May 1959, a Jupiter missile launched two small monkeys into space in a nose cone; this was America's first successful flight and recovery of live space payloads. Responsibility for deploying Jupiter missiles was transferred from the Army to the Air Force; armed with nuclear warheads, they were first deployed in Italy and Turkey during the early 1960s.

Space boosters
In July 1959, NASA chose the Redstone missile as the basis for the Mercury-Redstone Launch Vehicle to be used for suborbital test flights of the Project Mercury spacecraft. Three uncrewed MRLV launch attempts were made between November 1960 and March 1961, two of which were successful. The MRLV successfully launched the chimpanzee Ham, and astronauts Alan Shepard and Gus Grissom on three suborbital flights in January, May, and July 1961, respectively.

America's more ambitious crewed space travel plans included the design of the Saturn series of heavy-lift launch vehicles by a team headed by Wernher von Braun. Chrysler's Huntsville operation, then designated the Space Division, became Marshall Space Flight Center's prime contractor for the first stage of the Saturn I and Saturn IB versions. The design was based on a cluster of Redstone and Jupiter fuel tanks and Chrysler built it for the Apollo program in the Michoud Assembly Facility in East New Orleans, one of the largest manufacturing plants in the world. Between October 1961 and July 1975, NASA used ten Saturn Is and nine Saturn IBs for suborbital and orbital flights, all of which were successful; Chrysler missiles and boosters never suffered a launch failure. The division was also a subcontractor which modified one of the mobile launcher platforms for use with the Saturn IB rockets using Saturn V infrastructure.

See also

 Carl Breer
 Chrysler Building
 Chrysler World Headquarters and Technology Center
 Chrysler Hemi engine
 Chrysler Proving Grounds
 Frederick Morrell Zeder
 History of Chrysler
 Lee Iacocca
 List of automobile manufacturers of the United States
 List of Chrysler engines
 List of Chrysler factories
 List of Chrysler platforms
 List of Chrysler vehicles
 Mopar
 Owen Ray Skelton
 Virginia Sink
 Seida
 The Three Musketeers (Studebaker engineers)
 Walter P. Chrysler Museum
 Maxwell-Chalmers Automobiles
 United States Motor Company
 American Motors Corporation

Countries
 Chrysler Australia
 Chrysler Fevre Argentina - sold to Volkswagen in 1980
 FCA Canada
 Chrysler Kamyon Turkey - sold to the ASKAM in 2003.

References

Further reading

 
 
 
 Goolsbee, Austan D., and Alan B. Krueger. "A retrospective look at rescuing and restructuring General Motors and Chrysler." Journal of Economic Perspectives 29.2 (2015): 3-24. online

External links

 
 Chrysler Scientific Labs and Test Services
 Chrysler SEC Filings 
 Historic American Engineering Record (HAER) documentation, filed under 12200 East Jefferson Avenue, Detroit, Wayne County, MI:
 
 
 

 "Chrysler; Once Upon A Time and Now," Detroit Public Television, The Walter J. Brown Media Archives & Peabody Awards Collection at the University of Georgia, American Archive of Public Broadcasting

 
Stellantis
Car brands
Car manufacturers of the United States
Defense companies of the United States
Historic American Engineering Record in Michigan
Motor vehicle manufacturers based in Michigan
Luxury motor vehicle manufacturers
Marine engine manufacturers
Truck manufacturers of the United States
Auburn Hills, Michigan
Companies based in Oakland County, Michigan
Companies that filed for Chapter 11 bankruptcy in 2009
Former components of the Dow Jones Industrial Average
Vehicle manufacturing companies established in 1925
American companies established in 1925
Motor vehicle engine manufacturers
2007 mergers and acquisitions
2014 mergers and acquisitions
American subsidiaries of foreign companies
1925 establishments in Michigan